Seveste is a surname. Notable people with the surname include: 

Jacqueline Seveste (1844–1927), French opera singer
Jules Seveste (1803–1854), French playwright and theatre manager